Wendy Tripician ( Campanella, born July 19, 1974) is an American lightweight rower.

Campanella was born in 1974 in Needham, a suburb of Boston. She received her education at Simmons College, from where she graduated in 1996 with an under-graduate degree, and in 2002 with a graduate degree in health studies.

She competed, under her maiden name, at the 2002 World Rowing Championships in Seville, Spain with the lightweight squad scull and won bronze. In 2002, Nicholas Tripician was also part of the US National Team, and they would later marry.

At the 2008 World Rowing Championships in Linz, Austria, she won a bronze medal with the lightweight squad scull.

References

1974 births
Living people
Sportspeople from Needham, Massachusetts
American female rowers
World Rowing Championships medalists for the United States
Simmons University alumni
Pan American Games medalists in rowing
Pan American Games silver medalists for the United States
Rowers at the 2003 Pan American Games
21st-century American women